Daddy at Home (企鹅爸爸) is a Singaporean television series which debuted on the local Chinese language channel Channel 8 on 2 November 2009. It stars Li Nanxing, Chen Hanwei, Ann Kok, Cynthia Koh, Dawn Yeoh & Adam Chen as the casts of the series. It was screened every night at 9pm from Monday to Friday.

The series' Chinese title literally means "penguin father". As the series is about house husbands, the title was derived from the fact that Emperor penguins are the only penguin species of which the male is fully responsible for incubating the eggs.

Plot
Liu Bang is senior vice-president of a bank and takes great pride in his social standing. His friend Ye Zhengkang is a house husband who looks after the household and children while his wife Meihui owns a beauty parlour. Liu Bang, being a traditionalist, disapproves of this arrangement but Zhengkang is undaunted by the unwanted attention he occasionally receives due to his unusual "occupation".

However, the financial crisis hits Singapore and both Liu Bang and Zhengkang find themselves cash-strapped. Liu Bang in particular was the worst affected. As he had offended a superior years ago, he quickly became a target in the mass entrenchment. His wife Xinbei is forced to find a job to support the family. Liu Bang has to swallow his ego as he is suddenly forced to take over homemaker duties from his wife.

Meanwhile, Meihui's younger brother Jinfeng moves in with the family. The carefree happy-go-lucky Jinfeng falls head over heels for his nephew's tuition teacher Ruxuan and tries his best to woo her.

Cast

Main cast

Supporting cast

Awards & Nominations
Daddy at Home earned four nominations at the 2010 Star Awards and Chen won the Best Actor award.

References

Singapore Chinese dramas
2009 Singaporean television series debuts
2010 Singaporean television series endings
Channel 8 (Singapore) original programming